is a Japanese ice hockey player for the Nikko Ice Bucks of the Asia League Ice Hockey. Fukufuji was the first Japanese player to appear in a National Hockey League (NHL) game. The first Japanese draft pick, Hiroyuki Miura, was selected by the Montreal Canadiens in the 1992 NHL Draft, but never played in an NHL game. Fukufuji is the first Japanese citizen to be drafted as a goaltender in the NHL and second Japanese national to be drafted.

Career
Fukufuji was born in Kushiro, Hokkaidō, Japan. He played on the Kokudo hockey team of Asia League Ice Hockey in 2001. He was drafted by the Los Angeles Kings in the 2004 entry draft in the 8th round, 238th overall. He made his North American debut on February 7, 2003, with the ECHL Cincinnati Cyclones. He was voted the ECHL rookie of the month in January 2003. He played for the Bakersfield Condors of the ECHL in 2004–05 leading the team in wins, GAA, and shutouts. Fukufuji signed a two-year, entry-level contract with the Los Angeles Kings in August 2005. After starting the 2005–06 season with the Reading Royals, the Kings ECHL franchise, Yutaka was the number 2 goalie on the AHL Manchester Monarchs for a time.

On December 15, 2006, Fukufuji was called up on to the Los Angeles Kings on emergency basis. He became the first Japanese player to dress for an NHL game, but he did not play.

When goaltender Mathieu Garon was placed on injured reserve with a broken finger, Fukufuji was again recalled and flew in from Cleveland, Ohio to dress as backup to goalie Barry Brust. On January 13, 2007, Fukufuji made his first NHL appearance, the first by a Japanese player, when Kings head coach Marc Crawford decided to put him in to start the third period of a game against the St. Louis Blues. Fukufuji entered the game with the Kings trailing 5–4. He allowed one goal in the period, and the Kings also scored one goal while he was in net.  The final score of the game was 6–5 in favor of St. Louis; as Fukufuji was the goaltender who allowed the decisive sixth St. Louis goal, he was assessed the loss.

On January 16, 2007, Fukufuji made history again when he became the first Japanese player to start in an NHL game, as he began the game in goal for the Kings against the Atlanta Thrashers. He allowed 3 goals on 9 shots and was pulled.

Fukufuji was not presented with a qualifying offer by the Kings before the 2007–08 season, but returned to the Condors on September 10, 2007, after signing a contract for the 2007–08 season.

On May 25, 2009, Fukufuji was signed by the Destil Trappers of the Eredivisie, the top league in the Netherlands. After one full season with Destil Trappers Fukufuji signed with Nikko Ice Bucks in July 2010.

On January 29, 2020, it was announced that Fukufuji had been selected to represent Japan in the third round of qualifiers for the 2022 Beijing Olympics.

Career statistics

References

External links

1982 births
Living people
Asian Games medalists in ice hockey
Asian Games silver medalists for Japan
Asian Games bronze medalists for Japan
Bakersfield Condors (1998–2015) players
Cincinnati Cyclones (ECHL) players
Ice hockey players at the 2011 Asian Winter Games
Ice hockey players at the 2017 Asian Winter Games
Japanese ice hockey goaltenders
Los Angeles Kings draft picks
Los Angeles Kings players
Manchester Monarchs (AHL) players
Medalists at the 2011 Asian Winter Games
Medalists at the 2017 Asian Winter Games
Nikkō Ice Bucks players
People from Kushiro, Hokkaido
Reading Royals players